Molitor is a German surname meaning "miller". Notable people with the surname include:

 André Molitor (1911–2005), former principal private secretary of King Baudouin I of Belgium
 Bernard Molitor (1755–1833), Luxembourgish master carpenter
 Chris Molitor (born 1988), Australian basketball player
 Doug Molitor (born 1952), American screenwriter
 Gabriel Jean Joseph Molitor (1770–1849), French general
 Jeremy Molitor (born 1977), Canadian former boxer
 Joseph Franz Molitor (1779–1860), German writer and philosopher
 Joseph Molitor (1874-1917), Bohemian-born Chicago-based church architect
 Karl Molitor (1920–2014), Swiss skier
 Katharina Molitor (born 1983), German javelin thrower
 Marc Molitor (born 1948), French former football player
 Paul Molitor (born 1956), American baseball player
 Steve Molitor (born 1980), Canadian boxer
 Ulrich Molitor (1442-1507) 15th-century professor of law at the University of Constance, Germany
 Philippe Molitor (1869–1952), Belgian colonel

German-language surnames